Captain John Ellis Langford Hunter  (31 January 1897 – 18 June 1971) was a British World War I flying ace credited with 13 confirmed aerial victories.

Biography

Early life
Hunter was born in Hackney, London, the only son of Ellis Hunter, and was educated at Bedford Modern School.

Aerial service

Hunter joined No. 4 Squadron, flying a Sopwith Camel, in July. On 3 September, he and Flight Sub-Lieutenant K. V. Turney drove down a German observation plane out of control. On the 22nd, he shared one of his two victories with Turney when they shot down two seaplanes northeast of Ostend, for which he was subsequently awarded the Distinguished Service Cross.

Hunter was promoted to flight lieutenant on 31 December 1917. His next victory came on 21 March 1918 when he destroyed a Pfalz D.III off Middelkerke, and he destroyed another on the 26th. Soon after, on 1 April, the Army's Royal Flying Corps (RFC) and the Royal Naval Air Service (RNAS) were merged to form the Royal Air Force, and No. 4 Naval Squadron was renamed No. 204 Squadron RAF.

On 16 July 1918 Hunter was appointed a temporary captain while serving as a flight commander. He continued to score sporadically until 12 August, when he flamed one Fokker D.VII, destroyed another, and drove a third down out of control, to bring his total to 13. He suffered a leg wound in the process, but the action won him the Distinguished Flying Cross.

Aerial victory list

Postwar career
Hunter was confirmed in the rank of captain on 21 January 1919, but left the RAF six months later, being transferred to the unemployed list, on 2 July.

Ellis died in South Africa in 1971, and is buried in the cemetery at Somerset West, Western Cape.

Awards and citations
Distinguished Service Cross
Flight Sub-Lieutenant John Ellis Langford Hunter, R.N.A.S.
"In recognition of his services with a Wing of the R.N.A.S. at Dunkirk between July and September, 1917, during which time he has carried out continuous work on offensive patrols. On 22 September 1917, he destroyed two enemy aircraft which were attempting to interfere with our spotting machines."
 
Distinguished Flying Cross
Lieutenant (Temporary Captain) John Ellis Langford Hunter, D.S.C. (Sea Patrol).
"A fine fighting pilot and flight leader. On 12 September, whilst leading his formation on escort duty, he engaged nine Fokker biplanes. He destroyed two and drove a third down out of control. In this combat he was severely wounded in the leg."

References
Citations

Bibliography
 

1897 births
1971 deaths
People from Hackney Central
People educated at Bedford Modern School
Royal Naval Air Service aviators
Royal Air Force personnel of World War I
British World War I flying aces
Recipients of the Distinguished Service Cross (United Kingdom)
Recipients of the Distinguished Flying Cross (United Kingdom)